Gravatt may refer to:

People
Eric Gravatt, American jazz drummer
George Gravatt (1815–1843), officer in the British Army
John Segar Gravatt (1909–1983), American lawyer and judge

Geography
Mount Gravatt, Queensland, a town and hill in Queensland, Australia

See also
Cravat (disambiguation)
Gravatal
Gravatar
Gravataí
Gravati
Gravatá
Gravit